Alimentary Pharmacology & Therapeutics is a bimonthly peer-reviewed medical journal concerned with the effects of drugs on the human gastrointestinal and hepato-biliary systems, particularly with relevance to clinical practice. The journal publishes original papers concerned with all aspects of basic and clinical pharmacology, pharmacokinetics, and the therapeutic use of drugs in the alimentary tract including the liver, gall bladder, and pancreas. Its editors are J. M. Rhodes and C. W. Howden.

References

External links
 

English-language journals
Publications established in 1987
Wiley-Blackwell academic journals
Bimonthly journals
Gastroenterology and hepatology journals
Pharmacology journals